Chunlian is a subdistrict and the county seat located in the middle south of You County, Hunan, China. it was created by dividing five villages and communities of Lianxing Subdistrict on November 13, 2014.

History
Chunlian is historically a part of the former Liantang'ao Town. On December 27, 2011, dividing five villages of Liantang'ao Town, two villages of the former Shangyunqiao Town formed Lianxing Subdistrict.  On January 13, 2014, dividing five villages and communities from Lianxing Subdistrict amalgamated Chunlian Subdistrict. On November 26, 2015, three villages of Liantang'ao Town were changed to Chunlian Subdistrict under its jurisdiction.

Subdivisions
Chunlian Subdistrict has three villages and five communities under its jurisdiction.
5 communities
 Zhehe Community
 Shuangfeng Community
 Shangbei Community
 Chunlian Community
 Chunfeng Community
3 villages
 Panlong Village
 Chuntanglong Village
 Juzhou Village

References

Divisions of You County
County seats in Hunan